Vera Vasilyevna Kholodnaya ( Levchenko; ; ; 5 August 1893 – 16 February 1919) was an actress of Russian Empire cinema. She was the first star of Imperial Russian silent cinema. Only five of her films still exist and the total number she acted in is unknown, with speculation ranging between fifty and one hundred.

Early life 

Born in Poltava (Russian Empire, now Ukraine), she went to live in Moscow with her widowed grandmother at the age of two. As a girl she dreamed of a career in classical ballet and even enrolled at the Bolshoi Theatre ballet school. From early childhood Vera participated in family theatricals. When she was ten Vera was sent to the famous Perepelkina's grammar school.

Personal life 
At the graduation prom she met Vladimir Kholodny, who was then a student, an editor of a daily sport newspaper and a race-driver, said to be one of the first Russian car racers. They got married in 1910 despite disapproval of both families. Vera would often accompany him in races which resulted in road accidents. She also adopted his surname, which translates to "the cold one". Later, many took it for a well-chosen pseudonym. Their daughter Evgeniya was born in 1912, and they adopted a girl, Nata, a year later.

Career rise 

In 1908, Vera attended a performance of Francesca da Rimini, with Vera Komissarzhevskaya in the title role. She was deeply impressed with Komissarzhevskaya's artistry and decided to venture in film acting. She approached Vladimir Gardin, a leading Russian film director, who cast her in a minor role in his grand production of Anna Karenina.

In 1915 Yevgeni Bauer was to direct the film Song of Triumphant Love (Pesn Torzhestvuyushchey Lyubvi), a mystical love drama (after Turgenev) and was searching for an actress of outstanding beauty. When Vera Kholodnaya was introduced to Bauer, he at once approved her for the role, being impressed by her beauty.

Song of Triumphant Love was an enormous success and Yevgeni Bauer immediately started shooting his another movie starring Kholodnaya. It was a melodrama Flame of the Sky (Plamya Neba) about guilty love of a young woman married off to an old widower, and his son. Although Flame of the Sky was shot after Song of Triumphant Love, it was the first to go on screen and so brought fame to Vera Kholodnaya.

At first it was hard for Vera to convey complex psychological nuances and so she imitated the acting of Asta Nielsen but gradually developed her own style. Vera's extravagant costumes and large gray eyes made her an enigmatic screen presence which fascinated audiences across Imperial Russia.

Her next picture was The Children of the Age (Deti veka), aired in 1915, a drama with pretensions to revealing social problems.

Tremendous success was Pyotr Chardynin's tragic melodrama The Mirages (1916), followed by the 'fancy drama' Beauty Must Reign in the World by Yevgeni Bauer, melodrama Fiery Devil, and another melodrama A Life for a Life, which turned one of the most popular films in Vera Kholodnaya's career and brought her the title 'the Queen of Screen'. The author of this title was Alexander Vertinsky who venerated the actress and frequented her house. In 1916 Khanzhonkov's company started making the film Pierrot with Vertinsky and Kholodnaya playing the leads. Unfortunately, the film was not completed.

In the beginning of 1917 was released of one of the best films with Vera Kholodnaya, namely By the Fireplace (U kamina) which was based on a popular romance. The tragic film about a family broken by a rich lover ended with the death of the protagonist played by Vera Kholodnaya. The triumph of the drama exceeded all the films shot in Russia before that. It was so until 1918 when the movie Be Silent, My Sorrow, Be Silent (Molchi, grust, molchi) aired and received even great acceptance. Like many of her films, it was based on a Russian traditional love song. At the same time there was probably no other film so much criticized, especially after the revolution. By the middle of 1918 Vera Kholodnaya turned from just a popular and admired actress into a real phenomenon of the Russian cinema.

Her latest movies were Krasnaya zarya (1918), Zhivoy trup (1918), The Last Tango (1918).

However, only five works with Kholodnaya have been preserved. The Children of the Age was the earliest of them. The other four extant films are: The Mirages (1916), A Life for a Life (1916), A Corpse Living (1918), and Be Silent, My Sorrow, Be Silent (1918).

A Life for a Life was the film that definitively established Kholodnaya's star status.

World War I and the Russian Revolution 

After her husband was drafted to fight in World War I, Kholodnaya signed with a rival Khanzhonkov studio.

During World War I, Kholodnaya took part in charity concerts, selling gifts to support soldiers and their families. Soldiers worshipped Kholodnaya, calling her "our Verochka". In breaks between shooting sessions, Kholodnaya travelled to the front to visit her husband.

By the time of the Russian Revolution, a new Kholodnaya film was released every third week. At the Fire Side (1917) was her massive commercial success: the movie was run in cinemas until 1924, when the Soviet authorities ordered many of the Kholodnaya features destroyed. At the Fire Side was a drama based on a love triangle. The film's success prompted its director Petr Chardynin to make a sequel, Forget about the Fire, the Flame's Gone Out (1917), which was released during the October revolution. Forget about the Fire, together with another film, Be Silent, My Sorrow, Be Silent (1918) both with a circus theme broke all commercial records for Russian pre-revolutionary cinema.

During the Russian Civil War, the Bolshevik authorities requested film companies to produce less melodrama and more adaptations of classics. Accordingly, Kholodnaya was cast in a screen version of Tolstoy's The Living Corpse. Her acting abilities in this film were applauded by Konstantin Stanislavski, who welcomed Vera to join the troupe of the Moscow Art Theatre.

By that time, the actress had determined to move with her film company to Odessa, where she died at the age of 25 in the 1918 flu pandemic. On learning about her death, Alexander Vertinsky, wrote one of his most poignant songs, "Your fingers smell of church incense, and your lashes sleep in grief..." A director with whom she had worked for several years filmed her large funeral. Ironically, this seems to be her best known film today.

Circumstances of her death 
Official Russian records state that Vera Kholodnaya died of the Spanish flu during the pandemic of 1919. While that seems quite likely, there is much speculation around her death. Other stories claim she was poisoned by the French ambassador with whom she reportedly had an affair and who believed that she was a spy for the Bolsheviks.

Legacy 
Her life was dramatised in Nikita Mikhalkov's film A Slave of Love (1976). A documentary on her life was filmed in 1992. A year later, her image was depicted on a postage stamp and in 2003 a life-size bronze statue of her was erected in Odessa, created by the artist Alexander P. Tokarev.

Filmography 
Only eight of Kholodnaya's films have survived, in part or in whole:

Lost films

Films that were never released

See also 
Vsevolod Meyerhold
Vitold Polonsky
Ossip Runitsch

References

External links 

 Information on the Vera Kholodnaya monument in Odessa, Ukraine
 Biography
 Detailed account of her career
 Her bio and photographs

1893 births
1919 deaths
Deaths from Spanish flu
Actors from Poltava
Actresses from the Russian Empire